The Mt. Washington Arboretum is a  park with various trees, shrubs, and other plants in the Mt. Washington area of Baltimore.

History
The Mt. Washington Arboretum was founded in 1999. It was built on the site of an apartment complex destroyed during Hurricane David and later condemned.

External links
Mt. Washington Arboretum homepage
Mt. Washington Arboretum on Google Street View

References

Mount Washington, Baltimore
Parks in Baltimore